Byaban Rural District is a rural district (dehestan) in the Central District of Sirik County, Hormozgan Province, Iran. At the 2006 census, its population was 11,667, in 1,996 families.  The rural district has 36 villages.

References 

Rural Districts of Hormozgan Province
Sirik County